Ini Avan is a 2012 Sri Lankan Tamil-language post-war drama film directed by Asoka Handagama and co-produced by Anura Fernando, Jagath Wellavaththa and Ravindra Pieris. It stars Darshan Dharmaraj and Subashini Balasubramaniyam in lead roles along with Niranjani Shanmugaraja and Raja Ganeshan. Music composed by Kapila Poogalaarachchi. It is the 1244th Sri Lankan film in the Cinema of Sri Lanka. The films had positive reviews from critics. The film was also screened at 37th Toronto International Film Festival (TIFF) in 2012.

Plot

Cast
 Darshan Dharmaraj as Avan / Him
 Subhashini Balasubramaniam
 Niranjani Shanmugaraja
 Raja Ganeshan
 King Ratnam
 Malcolm Machado
 Mr & Mrs. Thairiyanathan
 G.P. Ferminas
 Maheswary Rathnam

Awards
The film was a major contender for every film festival held in the year. The film has won many awards including the best film, director and many more in many film festivals.

 Hiru Golden Film Awards 2012 Award of the Best Director - Ashoka Handagama
 Hiru Golden Film Awards 2012 Award of the Best Actor - Darshan Dharmaraj
 Hiru Golden Film Awards 2012 Award of the Best Supporting Actress 
 Hiru Golden Film Awards 2012 Award of the Best Editor - Ajith Ramanayake
 Hiru Golden Film Awards 2012 Award of the Best Film
 Derana Lux Film Awards 2013 Award of the Best Film
 Derana Lux Film Awards 2013 Award of the Best Screenplay - Ashoka Handagama
 Derana Lux Film Awards 2013 Award of the Best Director - Ashoka Handagama
 Derana Lux Film Awards 2013 Award of the Best Actor - Darshan Dharmaraj
 Derana Lux Film Awards 2013 Award of the Best Actress - Niranjani Shanmugaraja
 Derana Lux Film Awards 2013 Award of the Best Supporting Actor - Raja Ganeshan
 37th SIGNIS Salutation Cinema Awards 2014 Award for the Best Director - Ashoka Handagama
 37th SIGNIS Salutation Cinema Awards 2014 Award for the Best Screenplat - Ashoka Handagama

References

2012 films
Sri Lankan Tamil-language films
2010s Tamil-language films
Sri Lankan drama films
2012 drama films